Cissonius (also Cisonius, Cesonius) was an ancient Gaulish/Celtic god. After Visucius, Cissonius was the most common name of the Gaulish/Celtic Mercury; around seventeen inscriptions dedicated to him extend from France and Southern Germany into Switzerland.

Name 
The name has been interpreted as meaning 'carriage-driver' (from cissum 'carriage'), or 'dream-bringer' (from cit- attached to souno- 'sleep, dream').

A goddess Cissonia is also recorded.

Cult 
He was probably a god of trade and protector of travellers, since Mercury exercised similar functions in the Roman pantheon.

In one inscription from Promontogno in Switzerland, Cissonus is identified with Matutinus.

References

Bibliography

Gaulish gods
Commerce gods
Mercurian deities